The Journal of Clinical Endocrinology and Metabolism is a peer-reviewed medical journal in the field of endocrinology and metabolism. The current editor-in-chief is Paul Stewart.

References

External links
 

Publications established in 1941
Endocrinology journals
Monthly journals
English-language journals